Alfred Edwin Newcomb (20 November 1873 – 4 February 1932) was an English cricketer. Newcomb was a right-handed batsman who bowled both right-arm slow and right-arm fast-medium. He was born at Market Harborough, Leicestershire.

Newcomb made a single first-class appearance for Leicestershire against Hampshire in the 1911 County Championship at the United Services Recreation Ground, Portsmouth. In Hampshire's first-innings of 145 all out, Newcomb bowled ten overs which conceded 26 runs, while taking a single wicket, that of Jimmy Stone. In Leicestershire's first-innings of 182 all out, he was run out for a single run. He bowled sixteen wicketless overs in Hampshire's second-innings, which conceded 48 runs. He was again run out in Leicestershire's second-innings, this time for a duck, with Hampshire winning what was his only first-class appearance by 108 runs.

He died at the town of his birth on 4 February 1932.

References

External links
Alfred Newcomb at ESPNcricinfo
Alfred Newcomb at CricketArchive

1873 births
1932 deaths
People from Market Harborough
Cricketers from Leicestershire
English cricketers
Leicestershire cricketers